Milgithea is a genus of snout moths. It was described by William Schaus in 1922.

Species
 Milgithea alboplagialis
 Milgithea melanoleuca Hampson, 1896
 Milgithea rufiapicalis
 Milgithea suramisa
 Milgithea trilinearis

References

Epipaschiinae
Pyralidae genera